Allium lehmannii is a plant species endemic to southern Italy. It is found only the Island of Sicily in the Mediterranean and in the nearby Calabria region of the Italian mainland.

Allium lehmannii is a perennial, bulb-forming herb up to 30 cm tall. Leaves are very narrow and thread-like. Flowers are narrowly bell-shaped, the tepal tips spreading outwards but most of the tepals wrapping closely around the anthers and style. Tepals are white with a deep violet midvein.

References

lehmannii
Onions
Flora of Italy
Flora of Sicily
Plants described in 1909
Plants described in 1988